Salmo ciscaucasicus, the Caspian salmon, is a salmonid fish endemic to the Caspian Sea and its inflowing rivers. It was described in 1967 originally as a subspecies of Salmo trutta. S. ciscaucasicus lives on the western shore of the lake from northern Azerbaijan to the Ural River, while the main breeding river is the Terek. It lives at depths down to 50 m. Males can reach a maximum standard length of 130 cm.

Another species, Salmo caspius Kessler, 1877, inhabits the southern part of the Caspian, but it is considerably smaller in size.

References

ciscaucasicus
Fish described in 1967